Storm Shadow is an Anglo-French low-observable, long-range, air-launched cruise missile developed since 1994 by Matra and British Aerospace, and now manufactured by MBDA. Storm Shadow is the weapon's British appellation. In French service, it is called SCALP-EG (which stands for "Système de Croisière Autonome à Longue Portée – Emploi Général"; English: "General Purpose Long-Range Cruise Missile"). The missile is based on the French-developed Apache anti-runway cruise missile. They differ in that the Storm Shadow carries a warhead instead of submunitions.

In 2006, to meet the requirement issued by the French Ministry of Defence for a more potent cruise missile capable of being launched from surface vessels as well as submarines, and able to strike strategic and military targets from extended stand-off ranges with even greater precision, MBDA France began the development of the Missile de Croisière Naval (Naval Cruise Missile) or MdCN to complement the SCALP. The first firing test occurred in July 2013 and was a success. The MdCN has been operational on French FREMM frigates since 2017 and also equips France's Barracuda nuclear attack submarines, entering operational service in 2022.

Characteristics
It is powered by a turbojet at Mach 0.8 and can be carried by the now retired RAF Tornado GR4, Italian Tornado IDS, Saab Gripen, Dassault Mirage 2000 and Dassault Rafale aircraft. Storm Shadow was integrated with the Eurofighter Typhoon as part of the Phase 2 Enhancement (P2E) in 2015,  but will not be fitted to the F-35 Lightning II. 

The BROACH warhead features an initial penetrating charge to clear soil or enter a bunker, then a variable delay fuze to control detonation of the main warhead. Intended targets are command, control and communications; airfields; ports and power stations; AMS/ammunition storage; surface ships and submarines in port; bridges and other high value strategic targets.

It is a fire and forget missile, programmed before launch. Once launched, the missile cannot be controlled or commanded to self-destroy and its target information cannot be changed. Mission planners programme the missile with the target air defences and target. The missile follows a path semi-autonomously, on a low flight path guided by GPS and terrain mapping to the target area. Close to the target, the missile climbs and then bunts into a dive.

Climbing to altitude is intended to achieve the best probability of target identification and penetration. During the bunt, the nose cone is jettisoned to allow a high resolution thermographic camera (Infrared homing) to observe the target area. The missile then tries to locate its target based upon its targeting information (DSMAC). If it can not, and there is a high risk of collateral damage, it is capable of flying to a crash point instead of risking inaccuracy.

Recent enhancements include the capability to relay target information just before impact, usage of one-way (link back) data link, to relay battle damage assessment information back to the host aircraft. This upgrade is under development under a French DGA contract. Another feature planned for insertion into the weapon is an in-flight re-targeting capability, using a two-way data link. Storm Shadow will be refurbished under the Selective Precision Effects At Range 4 (SPEAR 4) missile project.

Some reports suggest a reduced capability version complying with Missile Technology Control Regime (MTCR) restrictions was created for export, for example to the United Arab Emirates.

The Future Cruise/Anti-Ship Weapon, currently under development, is expected to replace the Storm Shadow.

History

The competitive tender involved not only Matra and British Aerospace but McDonnell Douglas, Texas Instruments/Short Brothers, Hughes/Smiths Industries, Daimler-Benz Aerospace/Bofors, GEC-Marconi and Rafael as well. The Storm Shadow submitted by the first two companies was selected in June 1996. A development and production contract was signed in February 1997, by which time Matra and BAe had completed the merger of their missile businesses to form Matra BAe Dynamics. France ordered 500 SCALP missiles in January 1998.

The first successful fully guided firing of the Storm Shadow/SCALP EG took place at the CEL Biscarosse range in France at the end of December 2000 from a Mirage 2000N. The first British firing occurred in May 2001 from a Tornado flying from BAE Warton.

Combat use
RAF Tornados used Storm Shadow missiles operationally for the first time during the 2003 invasion of Iraq.  Although they were yet to officially enter service, "an accelerated testing schedule" saw them employed by the RAF's 617 Squadron in the conflict.

During the NATO intervention in the Libyan Civil War, the Storm Shadow/SCALP-EG was fired at pro-Gaddafi targets by French Air Force Rafales  and Italian Air Force and Royal Air Force Tornados. Targets included the Al Jufra Air Base. and a military bunker in Sirte, the home town of Libyan leader, Muammar Gaddafi. In December 2011, Italian defence officials noted that Italian Tornado IDS aircraft had fired between 20 and 30 Storm Shadows during the Libyan Campaign. This was the first time that Italian aircraft had fired the missile in live combat, and it was reported the missile had a 97 per cent success rate.

French aircraft fired 12 SCALP missiles at ISIS targets in Syria as part of Operation Chammal. These launches took place on 15 December 2015 and 2 January 2016. It is thought that these firings may have been approved after a decision by the French MOD to reduce their inventory of SCALP missiles to reduce costs. On Sunday 26 June 2016 the RAF used four Storm Shadow missiles against an ISIS bunker in Iraq. The Storm Shadow missiles were launched from two Tornado aircraft.  All four missiles scored direct hits, penetrating deep into the bunker. Storm Shadow missiles were used due to the bunker's massive construction.

The first flight of Storm Shadow missiles on the Eurofighter Typhoon took place on 27 November 2013 at Decimomannu air base in Italy, and was performed by Alenia Aermacchi using instrumented production aircraft 2.

In July 2016, the UK's MOD awarded a £28 million contract to support the Storm Shadow over the next 5 years.

In October 2016 the UK Government confirmed UK-supplied missiles were used by Saudi Arabia in the conflict in Yemen.

In April 2018 the UK Government announced they used Storm Shadow missiles deployed by Panavia Tornado GR4s to strike a chemical weapon facility in Syria. According to US Marine Corp Lt. Gen. Kenneth Mckenzie, the Him Shinshar chemical weapons storage facility near Homs was hit by 9 US Tomahawks, 8 British Storm Shadows, 3 French MdCN cruise missiles, and 2 French SCALP cruise missiles. Satellite images showed that the site was destroyed in the attack. Head of the Russian General Staff Main Operations Department Sergey Rudskoy, in his briefing for media on 14 April 2018, announced that all eight missiles launched from Tornados were shot down by Syrian Air Defense Forces, a claim denied by the US, UK and France. The Pentagon said that no missiles had been intercepted, and that the raids were “precise and overwhelming”. In response, the Russian Ministry of Defense, during a press conference in Moscow, presented parts of what they claimed was a downed Storm Shadow missile.

On 11 March 2021, two Royal Air Force Typhoon FGR4 jets operating out of RAF Akrotiri, Cyprus hit a cave complex south west of the city of Erbil in northern Iraq, where a significant number of ISIS fighters were reported, marking the first combat use of the Storm Shadow from the Typhoon.

It has been suggested that Storm Shadows, either deployed by Emirati Mirages or Egyptian Rafales, could have been used in the July 2020 airstrike against Al-Watiya Air Base during the Second Libyan Civil War. The attack against the base, which housed Turkish military personnel supporting the internationally recognized Government of National Accord, injured several Turkish soldiers, destroyed their MIM-23 Hawk anti-aircraft missiles systems and their KORAL Electronic Warfare System

Variants

The SCALP EG and Storm Shadow are identical except for how they integrate with the aircraft.

Black Shaheen

MdCN - Naval Cruise Missile

In 2006, MBDA France began the development of a longer range naval vertical launched cruise missile to be deployed on a new series of French warships in the 2010s and complement the SCALP/Storm Shadow. Called Missile de Croisière Naval (MdCN), it became operational on the six ASW/land-attack variants of the French FREMM multipurpose frigates in 2017 and on s in June 2022, using the A70 version of the Sylver launcher on the former and the 533 mm torpedo tubes on the latter. As it is not launched from a plane like the SCALP, the MdCN uses a booster during its launch phase to break out of the ship and gain some initial velocity.

The submarine version is encapsulated in an hydrodynamic hard container which is ejected when the missile reaches the surface.  Expected to fulfill a similar role as the American-developed BGM-109 Tomahawk, the range of the MdCN (well over 1000 km) is double that of the SCALP/Storm Shadow. The smaller s can also carry the MdCN missile. In addition to its longer range, the MdCN also distinguishes itself by its autonomous navigation performance and terminal guidance by infrared recognition.

France originally ordered 50 MdCN for its FREMM frigates in 2006 and delivery was expected in 2012. A further 100 surface-launched missiles were ordered in 2009, along with 50 for the planned Barracuda-class submarines. The €1.2bn (FY2011) project was to deliver 200 missiles at a unit cost of €2.48m, or €6m including development costs.

The MdCN's first complete qualification firing took place in July 2013, at the Biscarosse test range. During its third development firing, the MdCN perfectly met all its test requirements, including the validation of its autonomous navigation performance and terminal guidance by infrared recognition, which provide the weapon with its exceptionally high precision.

The MdCN was used in its first operational strike during the April 2018 bombing of Damascus and Homs against alleged Syrian chemical weapons production site, in coordination with the United States and United Kingdom, but without approval from the UN.

Although all the designated targets were reached during the mission, some missiles suffered considerable technical difficulties. In the navy's report, it was stated that nine SCALP missiles were successfully fired, but the last one failed an internal self-check and refused to take off from the rail, and was therefore abandoned at sea. Meanwhile, two frigates suffered from computer issues and were unable to launch their MdCNs; only the third frigate was able to do so. 

The problems encountered with the frigates suggest that the MdCN had issues integrating with the warships, most likely due to the new nature of the FREMMs, rather than with the missile itself. Some FREMMs deployed during the operation were not fully operationally ready, having been withdrawn from exercises only a few days prior. In the same report, it was also stated that the issues with the MdCN and the warships have already been fixed.

On October 20, 2020, it was reported that the first of the new Barracuda-class submarines to be commissioned, FS Suffren, had performed its first firing of the MdCN. The firing from the new submarine was highly awaited because of the technical issues encountered in the 2018 operational strike, which had led to deeper scrutiny. The test was successful. FS Suffren entered operational service on June 3, 2022.

Operators

 100+ delivered for the Egyptian Air Force as part of the Dassault Rafale deal. Range under 300 km.
 500 SCALP missiles ordered for the French Air Force in 1998. 50 MdCNs ordered in 2006 and a further 150 ordered in 2009 for the French Navy.
  90 ordered for the Hellenic Air Force in 2000 and 2003. More ordered and delivered in 2022 as part of the Dassault Rafale F3R deal. 
 200 ordered for the Aeronautica Militare in 1999.
 Unknown number ordered for the Indian Air Force in 2016 as part of the Dassault Rafale deal.
 140 ordered for the Qatar Air Force in 2015.
 Unknown number ordered for the Royal Saudi Air Force.
 Unknown number ordered for the United Arab Emirates Air Force in 1997. Known as Black Shaheen.
  The Independent estimated the order for the Royal Air Force to be in the range of 700–1000.

See also
3M14A (Russia)
AGM-129 ACM (United States)
AGM-158 JASSM (United States)
BrahMos-A (India & Russia)
Delilah missile (Israel)
Hatf-VIII (Ra'ad) (Pakistan)
HN-1 (China)
HOPE/HOSBO (Germany)
Joint Strike Missile (Norway)
TAURUS KEPD 350 (Germany, Spain & Sweden)
Kh-55 (Russia)
CVS401 Perseus (France & United Kingdom)
Popeye missile (Israel)
Ra'ad-II (Pakistan)
Saber (United Arab Emirates)
SOM (missile) (Turkey)
SOM (missile)-J (Turkey)
Wan Chien (Taiwan)
YJ-12 (China)
KD-88 (China)

Notes

References

External links

 MBDA's SCALP Naval page
 RAF long-range air-to surface missiles page
 FAS
 Global Security.org
 Storm Shadow Programme Update

Cruise missiles of the United Kingdom
Cruise missiles of France
Naval cruise missiles
Military equipment introduced in the 2000s
Post–Cold War missiles of the United Kingdom